Dewell is both a given name and surname of English origin.  Notable people with the name include:

Surname
Billy Dewell (1917–2000), American football player
Elizabeth Dewell (fl. 1641–1660), birth name of Elizabeth Lilburne, English Leveller
James D. Dewell (1837–1906), American politician

Given name
Dewell Brewer (born 1970), American football player
Dewell Gann Sr., namesake of the Gann House, Gann Building, and Gann Row Historic District in Benton, Arkansas

In fiction
Cassie Dewell, featured in several novels by author C. J. Box

English-language surnames